Aserotaspis is an extinct genus of jawless fish which existed in what is now northern Canada. It was first named by Dineley and Loeffler in 1976, and contains the species Aserotaspis canadensis.

References

Heterostraci genera
Fossils of Canada